Al-Ali' (العلي) (English: The Sublimely Exalted) may refer to:

 Al-Ali, one of the 99 names of God
 Al Ali (tribe)
 Al-Ali (Iraqi tribe)
 Naji al-Ali, Palestinian cartoonist assassinated in London 
 Ali (disambiguation)